This is a list of lakes in Uzbekistan:
 Akchakol Lake
 Aral Sea
 Arnasay Lakes
 Ayazkala Lake
 Lake Aydar
 
 Lake Charvak
 Karateren Lake
 Sarygamysh Lake
 
 Tuyabuguz Reservoir
 
 Zhyltyrbas Lake

See also
 

Uzbekistan
Lakes